Volkswagen AG, known internationally as the Volkswagen Group, is a German multinational automotive manufacturer headquartered in Wolfsburg, Lower Saxony, Germany. The company designs, manufactures and distributes passenger and commercial vehicles, motorcycles, engines and turbomachinery, as well as offering related services, including financing, leasing and fleet management. In 2016, it was the world's largest automaker by sales, and keeping this title in 2017, 2018 and 2019, selling 10.9 million vehicles. It has maintained the largest market share in Europe for over two decades. It ranked seventh in the 2020 Fortune Global 500 list of the world's largest companies.

The Volkswagen Group sells passenger cars under the Audi, Bentley, Cupra, Lamborghini, Porsche, SEAT, Škoda and Volkswagen brands; motorcycles under the Ducati name; light commercial vehicles under the Volkswagen Commercial Vehicles brand; and heavy commercial vehicles via the marques of listed subsidiary Traton (Navistar, MAN, Scania and Volkswagen Truck & Bus). It is divided into two primary divisions—the Automotive Division and the Financial Services Division—and as of 2008, it had about 342 subsidiary companies. Volkswagen also has three joint ventures in China, FAW-Volkswagen, SAIC Volkswagen and Volkswagen Anhui. The company has operations in roughly 150 countries, and it has 100 production facilities across 27 countries.

Volkswagen was founded in Berlin in 1937 and incorporated in Wolfsburg to manufacture the car that would become known as the Beetle. The company's production grew rapidly in the 1950s and 1960s. In 1965, it acquired Auto Union, which subsequently produced the first postwar Audi models. Volkswagen launched a new generation of front-wheel drive vehicles in the 1970s, including the Passat, Polo and Golf; the last became its bestseller. Volkswagen acquired a controlling stake in SEAT in 1986, making it the first non-German marque of the company, and acquired control of Škoda in 1994, of Bentley, Lamborghini and Bugatti in 1998, Scania in 2008 and of Ducati, MAN and Porsche in 2012. The company's operations in China have grown rapidly in the past decade, with the country becoming its largest market.

Volkswagen Aktiengesellschaft is a public company and has a primary listing on the Frankfurt Stock Exchange, where it is a constituent of the Euro Stoxx 50 stock market index, and a secondary listings on the Luxembourg Stock Exchange and SIX Swiss Exchange. It has been traded in the United States via American depositary receipts since 1988, currently on the OTC Marketplace. Volkswagen delisted from the London Stock Exchange in 2013. The government of Lower Saxony holds 12.7% of the company's shares, granting it, by law, 20% of the voting rights.

History

1937 to 1945
Volkswagen (meaning 'People's car' in German) was founded in Berlin as the Gesellschaft zur Vorbereitung des Deutschen Volkswagens mbH ('Limited Liability Company for the preparation of the German People's Car', abbreviated to Gezuvor) by the National Socialist Deutsche Arbeitsfront (German Labour Front) and incorporated on 28 May 1937. The purpose of the company was to manufacture the Volkswagen car, originally referred to as the Porsche Type 60, then the Volkswagen Type 1, and commonly called the Volkswagen Beetle. This vehicle was designed by Ferdinand Porsche's consulting firm, and the company was backed by the support of Adolf Hitler. On 16 September 1938, Gezuvor was renamed Volkswagenwerk GmbH ('Volkswagen Factory GmbH').

Shortly after the factory near Fallersleben was completed, World War II started, and the plant primarily manufactured the military Kübelwagen (Porsche Type 82) and the related amphibious Schwimmwagen (Type 166), both of which were derived from the Volkswagen. Only a small number of Type 60 Volkswagens were made during this time. The Fallersleben plant also manufactured the V-1 flying bomb, making the plant a major bombing target for the Allied forces.

1945 to 1970

After the war in Europe, in June 1945, Major Ivan Hirst of the British Army Royal Electrical and Mechanical Engineers (REME) took control of the bomb-shattered factory for use in repairing British Army vehicles, pending the expected disposal of the plant tooling and equipment as war reparations. However, no British car manufacturer was interested. A British report on the car said that "the vehicle does not meet the fundamental technical requirement of a motor-car … it is quite unattractive to the average buyer … To build the car commercially would be a completely uneconomic enterprise." In 1948, the Ford Motor Company of USA was offered Volkswagen, but Ernest Breech, a Ford executive vice president said he did not think either the plant or the car was "worth a damn." Breech later said that he would have considered merging Ford of Germany and Volkswagen, but after the war, ownership of the company was in such dispute that nobody could possibly hope to be able to take it over. As part of the Industrial plans for Germany, large parts of German industry, including Volkswagen, were to be dismantled. Total German car production was set at a maximum of 10% of the 1936 car production numbers. The company survived by producing cars for the British Army, and in 1948 the British Government handed the company back over to the German state, and it was managed by former Opel chief Heinrich Nordhoff.

Production of the Type 60 Volkswagen (re-designated Type 1) started slowly after the war due to the need to rebuild the plant and because of the lack of raw materials, but production grew rapidly in the 1950s and 1960s. The company began introducing new models based on the Type 1, all with the same basic air-cooled, rear-engine, rear-drive platform. These included the Volkswagen Type 2 in 1950, the Volkswagen Karmann Ghia in 1955, the Volkswagen Type 3 in 1961, the Volkswagen Type 4 in 1968, and the Volkswagen Type 181 in 1969.

In 1960, upon the flotation of part of the German federal government's stake in the company on the German stock market, its name became Volkswagenwerk Aktiengesellschaft (usually abbreviated to Volkswagenwerk AG).

On 1 January 1965, Volkswagenwerk acquired Auto Union GmbH from its parent company Daimler-Benz. The new subsidiary went on to produce the first post-war Audi models, the Audi F103 series, shortly afterwards.

Another German manufacturer, NSU Motorenwerke AG, was merged into Auto Union on 26 August 1969, creating a new company, Audi NSU Auto Union AG (later renamed AUDI AG in 1985).

1970 to 1999

From the late 1970s to 1992, the acronym V.A.G. was used by Volkswagen AG as a brand for group-wide activities, such as distribution and leasing. Contrary to popular belief, "V.A.G." had no official meaning, and was never the formal name of the Volkswagen Group.

On 30 September 1982, Volkswagenwerk made its first step expanding outside Germany by signing a co-operation agreement with the Spanish car manufacturer SEAT, S.A.

To reflect the company's increasing global diversification from its headquarters and main plant (the Volkswagenwerk in Wolfsburg), on 4 July 1985, the company name was changed again—to Volkswagen Aktiengesellschaft (Volkswagen AG).

On 18 June 1986, Volkswagen AG acquired a 51% controlling stake in SEAT, making it the first non-German subsidiary of the Volkswagen Group. On 23 December the same year, it became the Spanish company's major shareholder by increasing its share up to 75%.

In 1990—after purchasing its entire equity—Volkswagen AG took over the full ownership of SEAT, making the company a wholly owned subsidiary, and on 28 March 1991, another step to the expansion of the group's activities was made through the signing of a joint-venture partnership agreement with Škoda automobilová a.s. of Czechoslovakia, accompanied with the acquisition of a 30% stake in the Czech car manufacturer on 16 April 1991. On 19 December 1994, the group began the acquisition of Škoda Auto by raising its share to 60.3%. Later, on 11 December 1995, it became the Czech company's largest and controlling shareholder by increasing its share up to 70%.

Three prestige automotive marques were added to the Volkswagen portfolio in 1998: Bentley, Lamborghini, and Bugatti.

2000 to present

On 30 May 2000, after having gradually raised its equity share, Volkswagen AG took over the full ownership of Škoda Auto, making the company a wholly owned subsidiary.

From 2002 up to 2007, the Volkswagen Group's automotive division was restructured so that two major Brand Groups with different profile would be formed, the Audi Brand Group focused on more sporty values – consisted of Audi, SEAT and Lamborghini – and the Volkswagen Brand Group on the field of classic values – consisted of Volkswagen, Skoda, Bentley and Bugatti – with each Brand Group's product vehicles and performance being respectively under the higher responsibility of Audi and Volkswagen brands.

Volkswagen Group revealed on 24 October 2009 that it had made an offer to acquire long-time partner and German niche automotive manufacturer Wilhelm Karmann GmbH out of bankruptcy protection. In November 2009, the supervisory board of Volkswagen AG approved the acquisition of assets of Karmann, and planned to restart vehicle production at their Osnabrück plant in 2012.

In December 2009, Volkswagen AG bought a 49.9% stake in Dr. Ing. h.c. F. Porsche AG (more commonly known as Porsche AG) in a first step towards an 'integrated automotive group' with Porsche. The merger of Volkswagen AG and Porsche SE was scheduled to take place during the course of 2011. On 8 September 2011, it was announced that the planned merger "cannot be implemented within the time frame provided for in the Comprehensive Agreement". As reasons, unquantifiable legal risks, including a criminal probe into the holding's former management team were given. Both parties "remain committed to the goal of creating an integrated automotive group with Porsche and are convinced that this will take place". On 4 July 2012 Volkswagen group announced they would wrap up the remaining half of Porsche shares for 4.46 billion euros (US$5.58 billion) on 1 August 2012 to avoid taxes of as much as 1.5 billion euros, which would have to be paid if the wrap up happened after 31 July 2014. Volkswagen AG purchased the remaining stake in Porsche AG equaling 100% of the shares in Porsche Zwischenholding GmbH, effectively becoming its parent company as of 1 August 2012.

Volkswagen AG completed the purchase of 19.9% of Suzuki Motor Corporation's issued shares on 15 January 2010. Suzuki invested part of the amount received from Volkswagen into 1.49% percent of Volkswagen. In 2011, Suzuki filed a lawsuit at an arbitration court in London requesting that Volkswagen return the 19.9% stake.

On 25 May 2010, it was announced that Volkswagen Group, through it subsidiary Lamborghini Holding S.p.A., had acquired a 90.1% stake in the Italian automotive design house Italdesign Giugiaro.
In less than three months, the transaction had been completed making the Italian firm a member of the Volkswagen Group. Since 2013 the Volkswagen Group has held a 89.7% stake in Traton.

In 2015 research showed a security flaw in the keyless ignition of Volkswagen and other carmakers' vehicles. Volkswagen spent two years trying to keep the research from the public domain.

On 3 August 2015, Nokia announced that it had reached a deal to sell its Here digital maps division to a consortium of three German automakers—BMW, Daimler AG, and Volkswagen Group, for €2.8 billion. This was seen as an indication that the automakers were interested in automated cars.

Volkswagen held a 19.9% non-controlling shareholding in Suzuki between 2009 and 2015. An international arbitration court ordered Volkswagen to sell the stake back to Suzuki. On 17 September 2015, Suzuki paid $3.8bn to complete the stock buy-back just hours prior to a major scandal about emissions violations engulfing Volkswagen. Suzuki had wished to buy Fiat diesel engines.

Bugatti left the Volkswagen Group in November 2021, when the company became part of Bugatti Rimac, a joint venture between Rimac Automobili and Porsche AG.

Emissions scandal, 2015

On 18 September 2015, the US EPA announced that Volkswagen had installed a "defeat device" software code in the diesel models sold in the US from 2009 to 2015. The code was intended to detect when an emissions test was being conducted, and altered emissions controls for better compliance. Off the test stand, the controls were relaxed, and emissions jumped 35 to 40 times regulatory levels according to investigators at West Virginia University and the California Air Resources Board. About 482,000 vehicles are under the recall order, a potential $18 billion ($37,500 per violation) in fines are pending, and news accounts speculate a criminal indictment for the deception is certain. The VW Group CEO, Martin Winterkorn, said he was "deeply sorry" and ordered an external investigation. The software code was only revealed when the EPA refused to certify VW's 2016 models for sale in the US unless the corporation provided full disclosure. On Sunday, 20 September 2015, VW Group announced it was halting the sale of its four-cylinder diesel models in the US. The US EPA press release on its Notice of Violation, and the California Air Resources Board letter dated 18 September 2015 contain significant chronological detail of the agencies interaction with VW on the issue.

On 22 September 2015, VW AG admitted that 11 million cars worldwide had been fitted with software intended to deceive emissions testing. The company issued a profit warning, saying it had set aside $7 billion to fix the fraud. On 23 September 2015, Martin Winterkorn announced his resignation from the CEO position after a crisis meeting of the company board. On 25 September 2015 Matthias Müller was named CEO. Müller was the head of the Porsche marque within the VW corporate umbrella.

On 21 April 2017, a U.S. federal judge ordered Volkswagen "to pay a $2.8 billion criminal fine for rigging diesel-powered vehicles to cheat on government emissions tests". The "unprecedented" plea deal formalized a punishment that Volkswagen AG agreed to earlier in 2017. In addition, the plea deal includes a $1.5 billion settlement for various environmental, customs and financial violations.

Overall, Volkswagen will pay more than $30 billion in penalties and lawsuit settlements related to the scandal.

Electrification strategy 2025

In 2016, Volkswagen Group announced a corporate "Strategy 2025" that focuses on electrification of its portfolio. The VW Group developed the Volkswagen Group MEB platform chassis that will be utilized in a range of various cars and light utility vehicles across several VW Group marques due to its flexibility and floor-mounted battery.

As of May 2018, the VW Group has committed $48 billion in car battery supplies and plans to outfit 16 factories to build electric cars by the end of 2022. According to VW Group CEO Dr. Herbert Diess, the company will offer 25 electric models and 20 plug-in hybrids by 2020.

Production in Xinjiang 
Volkswagen Group came under pressure for cooperating with the Chinese government in the region of Xinjiang. In that same region, western-funded NGOs accused the Chinese government of having committed human rights abuses against the Uighur minority group, which included mass surveillance, incarceration, and forced labor. After these accusations emerged, Volkswagen responded, "We do not assume any of our employees are forced laborers." Süddeutsche Zeitung claimed that Volkswagen was operating a plant in Xinjiang at a loss in order to curry favor with the Chinese government to set up more lucrative plants in other parts of China, which Volkswagen denied, saying that the decision to set up the plant in 2012 was purely based on economics. Volkswagen is still operating a plant in the region as of 2020.

New Auto 
In 2021, Volkswagen Group released their New Auto strategy. The strategy was based on transitioning to electric cars, and building a shared platform, battery systems, software and mobility solutions to use across all their brands. This involves creating the Scalable Systems Platform, as well as developing software under a new subsidiary called CARIAD. Volkswagen Group aims by 2024 to transition to selling mostly electric cars. It aims to have six battery factories in Europe by 2030.

Finances 
For the fiscal year 2018, Volkswagen reported earnings of €13.920 billion, with an annual revenue of €235.849 billion, an increase of 2.2% over the previous fiscal cycle. Volkswagen's shares traded at over €148 per share, and its market capitalization was valued at US$73.8 billion in November 2018.

Operations

Rooted in Europe, the Volkswagen Group operates in 153 countries. Volkswagen Passenger Cars is the Group's original marque, and the other major subsidiaries include passenger car marques such as Audi, Bentley, Lamborghini, Porsche, SEAT, and Škoda. Volkswagen AG also has operations in commercial vehicles, owning Volkswagen Commercial Vehicles, along with controlling stakes in truck, bus and diesel engine manufacturers Scania AB and MAN SE.

Subsidiaries and brands
The Volkswagen Group comprises the following vehicle manufacturers and their corresponding brands:

Audi AG: 100% ownership — The current company was formed through the acquisitions of Auto Union from Daimler-Benz on 30 December 1964, and NSU Motorenwerke on 9 March 1969 - Audi being the sole surviving marque from the Auto Union combine. 
Audi Sport GmbH — Audi's performance engineering and manufacturing subsidiary.
Automobili Lamborghini S.p.A.: 100% ownership — acquired by AUDI AG in September 1998.
Ducati Motor Holding S.p.A.: 100% ownership — bought on 19 July 2012.
Bentley Motors Ltd: 100% ownership. Volkswagen purchased Rolls-Royce & Bentley from Vickers on 28 July 1998, however the purchase did not include the license to use the Rolls-Royce trademark on automobiles, which is controlled by Rolls-Royce Plc. BMW outmaneuvered Volkswagen, succeeding in obtaining the rights to use the Rolls-Royce trademark on automobiles. From July 1998 until December 2002, BMW continued to supply engines for the Rolls-Royce Silver Seraph and the Bentley division sold cars under both the Bentley and Rolls-Royce marques, under an agreement with BMW. In January 2022, Bentley became part of the Audi group.

Dr. Ing. h.c. F. Porsche AG: 75% ownership — Volkswagen AG purchased 49.9% of the shares in Porsche Zwischenholding GmbH (the holding company of Porsche AG) in December 2009. Volkswagen AG purchased the remaining stake in Porsche AG equaling 100% of the shares in Porsche Zwischenholding GmbH, effectively becoming its parent company as of 1 August 2012. 25% of shares sold in an IPO of Porsche AG in 2022.
Jetta: Joint venture with First Automotive Works created in 2019.
Scout Motors Inc.: 100% ownership — founded in 2022.
SEAT, S.A.: 100% ownership — initially in 1982 a co-operation agreement with AUDI AG; 51% and 75% ownership in 1986, and full ownership in 1990. SEAT was the first non-German subsidiary of the Volkswagen Group.
Cupra: 100% ownership by SEAT. In 2018, SEAT's motorsport division SEAT Sport was renamed Cupra Racing and at the same time, Cupra was launched as an independent brand alongside SEAT.
Škoda Auto a.s.: 100% ownership — initially in 1991 a co-operation agreement and 30% ownership; 60.3% and 70% ownership in 1994 and 1995 respectively, 100% ownership since 2000
TRATON SE: 89.7% ownership — Formerly Volkswagen Truck and Bus, TRATON is the holding company for Volkswagen Group's heavy commercial vehicle operations. 
MAN Truck & Bus SE: 100% ownership — Transferred to TRATON SE after it merged with MAN SE in August 2021.
Navistar International Corporation: 100% ownership — produces heavy trucks under the International brand. Wholly owned by TRATON SE since July 2021. Volkswagen Truck and Bus (now TRATON) took an initial 16.6% stake in Navistar in February 2017.
Scania AB: 100% ownership — wholly owned by TRATON SE since 15 January 2015. Volkswagen acquired a controlling stake in July 2008, making Scania the 9th marque of the Volkswagen Group.
Volkswagen Truck & Bus: 100% ownership — Volkswagen's Brazilian heavy truck and bus division. Sold by Volkswagen Group to MAN SE in December 2008 and from that point was also known as MAN Latin America. In November 2011, Volkswagen acquired a majority of the shares in MAN SE, bringing Volkswagen Truck & Bus back into the group. Transferred to TRATON SE after it merged with MAN SE in August 2021.

Volkswagen Commercial Vehicles: 100% ownership — Volkswagen's light commercial vehicle division started operations as an independent entity in 1995.
Volkswagen Passenger Cars: 100% ownership — the founding and flagship marque of the company.Other subsidiaries and shareholdings:
Bugatti Rimac: Joint venture between Porsche AG (45%) and Rimac Group (55%).
MOIA: 100% ownership — new mobility services company.
Italdesign Giugiaro S.p.A.: 100% ownership — 90.1% acquired via Lamborghini S.p.A. in May 2010. Remaining shares transferred in July 2015.
IAV: 50% ownership.
Diconium: 100% ownership — since January 2020.
PayByPhone: a pay by phone parking service that allows users to pay for parking remotely. The service processes more than US$740 million / €660 million Euros in payments and more than 5 million downloads a year.

The Group also owns five defunct marques which are managed through the companies Auto Union GmbH and NSU GmbH, both of which are 100% owned by AUDI AG:

Auto Union — the Auto Union company, together with NSU Motorenwerke AG (NSU), were merged into "Audi NSU Auto-Union AG" in 1969. The name was shortened to "AUDI AG" in 1985, and the interlocked four-ring badge from Auto Union is still used by AUDI AG.
Dampf-Kraft-Wagen (DKW)
Horch
NSU Motorenwerke AG (NSU) – bought in 1969 by Volkswagen AG, and merged into "Audi NSU Auto-Union AG"; the NSU brand has not been used since 1977, while the former NSU manufacturing plant at Neckarsulm is still used for Audi assembly.
Wanderer

Corporate affairs

Ownership

Under the Volkswagen Law, no shareholder in Volkswagen AG could exercise more than 20 percent of the firm's voting rights, regardless of their level of stock holding. This law was supposed to protect Volkswagen Group from takeovers. In October 2005, Porsche acquired an 18.53 percent stake in the business, and in July 2006, Porsche increased that ownership to more than 25 percent. Analysts disagreed as to whether the investment was a good fit for Porsche's strategy.

On 26 March 2007, after the European Union moved against the Volkswagen law, Porsche took its holding to 30.9 percent, triggering a takeover bid under German law. Porsche formally announced in a press statement that it did not intend to take over Volkswagen Group, setting its offer price at the lowest possible legal value, but intended the move to avoid a competitor taking a large stake, or to stop hedge funds dismantling Volkswagen Group, which is Porsche's most important partner.
On 16 September 2008, Porsche announced that the company had increased its stake in Volkswagen AG to 35 percent. By October 2008, Porsche held 42.6 percent of Volkswagen AG's ordinary shares, and held stock options on another 31.5 percent. thus, effectively holding over 74 percent; 42.6 percent actual shares, and the rest as convertible options. Volkswagen AG briefly became the world's most valuable company, as the stock price rose to over €1,000 per share as short sellers tried to cover their positions. The substantial investment in Volkswagen left Porsche with huge financial burden with its debts accumulating up to 13 billion euros by 2009. Porsche would get emergency infusion of about a billion dollars from Volkswagen. In July 2012, Volkswagen completed takeover of Porsche ending the 4 year saga and formed an integrated automotive group with Porsche. Porsche AG would become the 10th brand of Volkswagen. The holding company Porsche SE was left with 31 percent of the subscribed capital of Volkswagen AG, and 50.7 percent of the voting rights in the company.

, share ownership of Volkswagen AG is distributed as follows:

Stock market listings

Volkswagen AG shares are primarily traded on the Frankfurt Stock Exchange, and are listed under the 'VOW' and 'VOW3' stock ticker symbols. First listed in August 1961, the shares were issued at a price of DM 350 per DM 100 share, Volkswagen AG shares are now separated into two different types or classes: 'ordinary shares' and 'preference shares'. The ordinary shares are now traded under the WKN 766400 and ISIN DE0007664005 listings, and the preference shares under the WKN 766403 and ISIN DE0007664039 listings.

Volkswagen AG shares are also listed and traded on other major domestic and worldwide stock exchanges. In Germany's domestic exchanges, since 1961 these include those in Berlin, Düsseldorf, Hamburg, Hanover, Munich and Stuttgart. International exchanges include those in Basel (listed in 1967), Geneva (1967), Zürich (1967), Luxembourg (1979), London (1988), and New York (1988).

Since the start of trading in 1961, Volkswagen AG shares have been subjected to two stock splits – the first was on 17 March 1969 when they were split at a ratio of 2:1, from a DM 100 share to a DM 50 share. The second split occurred on 6 July 1998, the DM 50 share being converted into a share of no overall nominal value, at a ratio of 1:10.

From 23 December 2009, Volkswagen AG preferred shares replaced its ordinary shares in the DAX index.

Leadership, sales and market share

In 2018, Volkswagen Group's largest single country market was China with 4.20 million units delivered, followed by Germany with 1.12 million units. Divided by regions, Asia-Pacific was the second-largest market of the Volkswagen Group with 4.50 million units in 2013, followed by Western Europe with 4.14 million, and North America with 943,000 units delivered in 2018.

The European ranking of automakers is compiled monthly by the European Auto Manufacturers' Association ACEA. Volkswagen has held the top spot in Europe uninterrupted for more than two decades.

The company was again the top global automaker in 2018, for the fifth consecutive year, selling 10.083 million vehicles in the year 2018, just 7,000 more than the Renault–Nissan–Mitsubishi Alliance.

Co-management 

With 120,000 employees in Germany and 600,000 globally, it is one of the most well organized labour represented companies in the world. The role that Works Councils and the trade union IG Metall play is unique even within Germany. VW workers have some of the strongest collective agreements. With the exception of the United States, all of its major locations are represented in the Global Works Council and local trade union bodies. VW has a strong tradition and practice of social partnership and co-determination rights globally.

Sponsorships

Volkswagen is heavily involved in sports sponsorship, with investments having included the 2008 Summer Olympics, the 2014 Winter Olympics, as well as the David Beckham Academy. Volkswagen AG wholly owns the Bundesliga football side VfL Wolfsburg; the company is also the shirt sponsor of Major League Soccer club D.C. United, League of Ireland Premier Division Sligo Rovers and top level of the Mexican football league system Liga MX team Puebla F.C.

See also

 List of automobile manufacturers
 List of automobile manufacturers of Germany
 List of Volkswagen Group factories
 List of Volkswagen Group platforms
 Wolfsburg Volkswagen Plant

Notes

References

Corporate documents

External links

 
 

 
Conglomerate companies of Germany
Emergency services equipment makers
Battery electric vehicle manufacturers
Motor vehicle engine manufacturers
Diesel engine manufacturers
Multinational companies headquartered in Germany
Companies based in Lower Saxony
Conglomerate companies established in 1937
Vehicle manufacturing companies established in 1937
German companies established in 1937
1960s initial public offerings
Companies in the Euro Stoxx 50
Companies listed on the Frankfurt Stock Exchange
Companies formerly listed on the London Stock Exchange
Companies involved in the Holocaust
Government-owned companies of Germany